Big Creek or Cala Grande is a deep-water port facility on the Caribbean Sea in Belize's Toledo District (just south of the boundary with Stann Creek District), constructed in the 1990s. It is the nation's second largest port, after Belize City. Big Creek is the main port for Belize's banana industry; citrus fruit and shrimp are also exported from here. It is also the location from which oil, extracted from the fields of Spanish Lookout, is exported.

Facilities
The port is ISPS certified and has 3 berths. Cargoes handled include bananas, citrus fruit and petroleum.

Hurricanes
The port is not a designated safe harbour with regard to hurricane preparedness.

Big Creek was the location in which the Peter Hughes dive boat "Wave Dancer" capsized during Hurricane Iris in October 2001, killing 20 persons, comprising 3 crew members and 17 vacationing divers from Richmond, Virginia.

References

External links

Populated places in Toledo District
Port cities in the Caribbean
Ports and harbours of Belize